Joshua S. Sims (born July 29, 1978) is an American former professional lacrosse player.  He played in Major League Lacrosse through 2013 and last played box lacrosse in the National Lacrosse League with the Philadelphia Wings in 2010.  He starred as a member of the Princeton Tigers men's lacrosse team from 1997 through 2000. He is a two-time NCAA champion, three-time MLL champion, and one-time NLL champion.

At Princeton, he earned Ivy League Player of the Year honors, three first team United States Intercollegiate Lacrosse Association (USILA) All-American recognitions and three first team All-Ivy League selections, two NCAA midfielder of the year honors, NCAA Top VIII Award recognition and two-time Academic All-American (first team once) honors.  During his college career, Princeton earned four Ivy League championships, four NCAA Men's Lacrosse Championship tournament invitations and two NCAA championships.

As a professional, he is a five-time MLL All-star and an NLL All-star.  In the MLL, he has earned two league championships and holds the all-time league record for playoff goals scored. He also has an NLL championship.  He was selected to the MLL 10th Anniversary team in August 2010 and the Colorado Mammoth 10th Anniversary team in 2011.

Sims is currently Head of Lacrosse for the Premier Lacrosse League.

Background
As an ambidextrous junior lacrosse midfielder, he scored 20 goals and had 16 assists for the Severn School, earning him All-Anne Arundel County honors from the Baltimore Sun.  Sims was an All-Anne Arundel County selection by the Baltimore Sun again as a senior captain when he was also named an All-Metro selection for controlling 72% of his face-offs, while scoring 28 goals and adding 12 assists.   Sims was a member of the Under-19 Team USA that won the World Championship in Tokyo in 1996.

Collegiate career
After graduating from Severn, Sims attended Princeton University.  He was the first Princeton  Student-Athlete to be presented with the NCAA Top VIII Award (the first lacrosse player to be presented with the award since 1983). He was only the fourth Ivy League athlete honored in the award's 27-year history.  He was awarded the 1998 & 2000 McLaughlin Award as the best NCAA lacrosse midfielder. He was a first team USILA All-American Team selection in 1998, 1999 and 2000.  He was also first team All-Ivy League in 1998, 1999 and 2000.  Sims earned the 2000 Men's Ivy League Player of the Year. As a freshman, he was a member of the 1997 team that is regarded as the best in school history with a record number of wins during its 15–0 season.  He served as co-captain of the 2000 team. Sims is one of two Princeton Lacrosse two-time Academic All-Americans.  Following the 1999 season, he was selected as an at-large second team Academic All-American, and following the 2000 season, he was a first team selection. He was also a 2000 USILA Scholar All-American.

The 1997–2000 teams were 6–0 undefeated outright Ivy League Conference champions.  Two of these undefeated league champions won the 1997 and 1998 NCAA Division I Men's Lacrosse Championships, becoming the first team to threepeat since Syracuse from 1988–90 and the first to be recognized to have done so without an NCAA scandal since Johns Hopkins from 1978–80. The 1999 and 2000 teams also earned NCAA Men's Lacrosse Championship invitations, bringing the schools streak to eleven consecutive seasons.

In Sims' first game as a Tiger, he scored the game-winning goal in a 1997 overtime 7–6 victory over Johns Hopkins.  Ten years later, ESPN described the goal as a "leaping, behind-the-back" shot, while the Baltimore Sun described the shot by saying that ". . .Sims flicked in a rebound shot blindly behind his back."  He was recognized twice in 1997 as Ivy League Rookie of the Week. During the 1998 season, Sims became a scoring threat from midfield as most defenses focused on the All-American trio of Princeton attackmen (Jesse Hubbard, Chris Massey and Jon Hess). In the 1998 NCAA Division I Men's Lacrosse Championship tournament, Sims scored a game-high four goals in the quarterfinal 11–9 victory over Duke and a team-high three goals, including the game-winning goal in the semifinal 11–10 victory against Syracuse.  For his efforts, he was named to the All-tournament team. In 1999, he scored a quadruple overtime game-winning goal helping Princeton secure it invitation to the 1999 NCAA Division I Men's Lacrosse Championship tournament with its seventh consecutive victory. In the 2000 NCAA Division I Men's Lacrosse Championship tournament, he posted two goals and two assists in the 10–7 quarterfinal victory over Maryland.  He also scored in the 12–11 semifinal victory against Virginia. Sims' two goals made him the only person to score multiple goals for Princeton in the championship game 13–7 loss to Syracuse.

Professional career

NLL career
Sims played the 2000 and 2001 seasons for the Washington Power of the National Lacrosse League.
  He then played the 2003 through 2009 seasons with the Colorado Mammoth. Sims was an original member of the Mammoth when they moved from Washington. He helped lead the Mammoth to their 2006 National Lacrosse League Champion's Cup. In 2007 Season he was recognized by the league as one of the top transition players in the game by being named Transition Player of the Week three times and being named to his first National Lacrosse League All-Star Game as a reserve. Prior to the 2009 NLL season, Sims announced his retirement from the indoor lacrosse league, and officially retired after the 2009 season.  However, he returned to play the 2010 season for the Philadelphia Wings.

MLL career
Sims, who did not play in the 2014 season, has played in the MLL since 2001: Baltimore Bayhawks (2001–2005); Denver Outlaws (2006–2009, 2012), Toronto Nationals (2010) and Chicago Machine (2010). Sims was a starter and scored in the inaugural MLL All-Star Game in 2001.  In 2002 and 2005 he was a member of the Baltimore Bayhawks Major League Lacrosse Champion Steinfeld Cup winners. In the 2002 All-Star game he had a goal and an assist. In the 2002 championship game, he scored four second half goals in the 21–13 victory over the Long Island Lizards, which followed a two-goal semifinal performance in a 15–10 victory over the Boston Cannons. During the 2005 season, he made his third MLL All-Star Game appearance. During the playoff semifinals, he 3 goals and 9 ground balls. One of his goals put the Bayhawks ahead for good. Sims was acquired by the Denver Outlaws on March 6, 2006, for the Outlaws 2006 first-round, 2nd overall, Collegiate Draft Pick that eventually became Kyle Dixon. Sims returned to the MLL All-Star game in 2006 and 2007 representing the Outlaws. He scored two goals (one for two points) in the 2006 contest. In December, 2009, Sims was picked up by the Washington Bayhawks during the MLL supplemental draft. On February 12, 2010, Sims was traded from the Bayhawks to the Toronto Nationals. In June, Sims was traded from the Nationals to the Chicago Machine.

, Sims was the Major League Lacrosse All-Time leader in post-season goals scored (29).  That month, during the MLL championship weekend, he was named to the 11-man MLL 10th Anniversary team. He did not play in 2011, but in 2012 he returned to the Denver Outlaws and even scored 5 goals in one game for them. He began 2013 on the sideline with a hamstring injury for the Bayhawks.

Personal life
Sims was the founder of Icon Lacrosse, LLC, and former Director of the Boulder Valley Lacrosse Association.  According to his Denver Outlaws biography, he is married to Meghan Bauer Sims.

In college, he helped the Tigers to raise approximately $60,000 for the Central Jersey Pediatric AIDS foundation and worked with the Special Olympics.  He was an economics major at Princeton and an honors graduate, maintaining a 3.54 GPA.

In the season 9 December 9, 2011 episode of Extreme Makeover: Home Edition on ABC, Sims' helped build a house in Mardela Springs, Maryland over a span of 106 hours in just five days. The nonprofit Project 911 (911nfp.org) along with The Fusion Cos., an Annapolis modular-home builder, built The Johnson-Goslee Family house.

In 2009, Sims was inducted into the Athletic Hall of Fame at his high school, Severn School. In 2020, during the George Floyd protests, Sims renounced this recognition over the school's "failed leadership" in addressing systemic racism.

Statistics

NLL
The following are his NLL career stats:

MLL
The following are his MLL career stats:

Princeton University

References

External links
Sims at MLL
Sims at NLL
Sims archive at Baltimore Sun

1978 births
American lacrosse players
Colorado Mammoth players
Lacrosse midfielders
Living people
Major League Lacrosse players
National Lacrosse League All-Stars
Sportspeople from Annapolis, Maryland
Philadelphia Wings players
Princeton Tigers men's lacrosse players
Washington Stealth players